Marina Kuptsova (born December 22, 1981 in Moscow) is a Russian high jumper who won a silver medal at the 2003 World Championships. She is also a former European indoor high jump champion. Her personal best jump of 2.02 metres was achieved in Hengelo in June 2003, a year when she also won the national championship.

She set a personal best of 2.00 m to win the 2002 Hochsprung mit Musik, and returned the following year with a season's best of 2.02 m to score a second victory.

She missed 2004 because of an Achilles tendon injury and spent the 2005 season trying to return to her best but she only managed 1.92 metres, which, however, was enough for a second place in the Russian championships.

International competitions

References

Marina Kuptsova at European Athletics

1981 births
Living people
Athletes from Moscow
Russian female high jumpers
Olympic female high jumpers
Olympic athletes of Russia
Athletes (track and field) at the 2000 Summer Olympics
World Athletics Championships athletes for Russia
World Athletics Championships medalists
European Athletics Championships medalists
Russian Athletics Championships winners